Frank Campbell may refer to:
 Frank Campbell (New York politician) (1858–1924), American politician, New York State comptroller
 Frank T. Campbell (1836–1907), American politician, lieutenant governor of Iowa
 Frank Campbell (footballer, born 1907) (1907–1985), Scottish footballer (Southampton FC)
 Frank Campbell (footballer, born 1950), Scottish footballer (Grimsby Town)
 Frank E. Campbell (1872–1934), founder of the Frank E. Campbell Funeral Chapel
 Frank Campbell (bowls), Irish lawn bowls player

See also 
 Francis Campbell (disambiguation)